Maritta Politz (later Cierpinski, born 18 May 1950) is a German middle-distance runner. She competed in the women's 800 metres at the 1972 Summer Olympics. She is married to the athlete Waldemar Cierpinski.

References

External links
 

1950 births
Living people
Athletes (track and field) at the 1972 Summer Olympics
German female middle-distance runners
Olympic athletes of East Germany
Place of birth missing (living people)